Pševo is a small village in the hills west of Kranj in the Upper Carniola region of Slovenia.

References

External links

Pševo on Geopedia

Populated places in the City Municipality of Kranj